The Chiredzi Solar Power Station is a  solar power plant under development in Zimbabwe. The project is rated as one of the largest single investment by a local company in Masvingo Province, since independence in 1980.

Location
The power station is located in Chiredzi District, in Masvingo Province, along the  Ngundu–Triangle Road.

Overview
The power station is designed to have capacity of 90 megawatts, developed in two phases of 45 megawatts each. Its output is expected to be sold directly to the Zimbabwe Electricity Transmission and Distribution Company (ZETDC) for integration into the national grid, under a long-term power purchase agreement.

Developers
The power station is being developed by a Zimbabwean power development consortium called Triangle Solar System (TSS). TSS is headed by Paradzai Chakona, a businessman and area member of parliament and was granted a generation licence on 22 May 2020 by the Zimbabwe Energy Regulatory Authority (ZERA).

Construction costs, and commissioning
The construction costs have been budgeted at US$88.1 million. This investment would cover land acquisition, land preparation, hardware, infrastructure, grid connection and civil works. The project is expected to create in excess of 300 temporary and permanent jobs.

If everything goes as planned, construction would begin in September 2020, with plant commissioning planned for the first half of 2021. TSS plans to build other solar power plants in the country, to alleviate the ongoing power shortage in Zimbabwe.

See also

List of power stations in Zimbabwe

References

External links
  Zimbabwe: 90MW solar plant set for Chiredzi As of 12 June 2020.

Solar power stations in Zimbabwe
Chiredzi District
Masvingo Province